Veliky (masculine), Velikaya (feminine), or Velikoye (neuter) is the name of several rural localities in Russia.

Modern localities
Velikoye, Primorsky District, Arkhangelsk Oblast, a village in Zaostrovsky Selsoviet of Primorsky District of Arkhangelsk Oblast
Velikoye, Velsky District, Arkhangelsk Oblast, a settlement in Puysky Selsoviet of Velsky District of Arkhangelsk Oblast
Velikoye, Leningrad Oblast, a logging depot settlement in Seleznevskoye Settlement Municipal Formation of Vyborgsky District of Leningrad Oblast
Velikoye, Kaduysky District, Vologda Oblast, a selo in Velikoselsky Selsoviet of Kaduysky District of Vologda Oblast
Velikoye, Sheksninsky District, Vologda Oblast, a village in Domshinsky Selsoviet of Sheksninsky District of Vologda Oblast
Velikoye, Tarnogsky District, Vologda Oblast, a village in Ramensky Selsoviet of Tarnogsky District of Vologda Oblast
Velikoye, Nesvoysky Selsoviet, Vologodsky District, Vologda Oblast, a village in Nesvoysky Selsoviet of Vologodsky District of Vologda Oblast
Velikoye, Priluksky Selsoviet, Vologodsky District, Vologda Oblast, a village in Priluksky Selsoviet of Vologodsky District of Vologda Oblast
Velikoye, Yaroslavl Oblast, a selo in Velikoselsky Rural Okrug of Gavrilov-Yamsky District of Yaroslavl Oblast
Velikaya, Ustyansky District, Arkhangelsk Oblast, a village in Dmitriyevsky Selsoviet of Ustyansky District of Arkhangelsk Oblast
Velikaya, Verkhnetoyemsky District, Arkhangelsk Oblast, a village in Gorkovsky Selsoviet of Verkhnetoyemsky District of Arkhangelsk Oblast
Velikaya, Kirov Oblast, a railway station in Verkhovinsky Rural Okrug of Yuryansky District of Kirov Oblast
Velikaya, Pskov Oblast, a village in Pustoshkinsky District of Pskov Oblast
Velikaya, Cherepovetsky District, Vologda Oblast, a village in Anninsky Selsoviet of Cherepovetsky District of Vologda Oblast
Velikaya, Tarnogsky District, Vologda Oblast, a village in Verkhovsky Selsoviet of Tarnogsky District of Vologda Oblast

Abolished localities
Velikaya, Novgorod Oblast, a village under the administrative jurisdiction of the urban-type settlement of Lyubytino in Lyubytinsky District of Novgorod Oblast; abolished in December 2012